The World Ain't Enuff is the third studio album by American rapper Tela. It was released on September 19, 2000 through Rap-A-Lot Records. Recording sessions took place at House Of Blues in Memphis, at Hippie House Studios in Houston, and at Pacifique Studios in North Hollywood. Production was handled by Tela himself, along with DJ Slice T. It features guest appearances from AK, Devin the Dude, Gangsta Blac, Jazze Pha, Low Key, Money Marv and Scarface. The album peaked at number 47 on the Billboard 200 and number 8 on the Top R&B/Hip-Hop Albums.

Track listing

Sample credits
Track 6 contains a portion of "Friends" written by Jalil Hutchins and Lawrence Smith
Track 13 contains a portion of "Look What You Done for Me" written by Al Green, Al Jackson Jr. and Willie Mitchell

Personnel
Winston "Tela" Rogers – main artist, producer
Devin "Devin the Dude" Copeland – featured artist (track 9)
Courtney "Gangsta Blac" Harris – featured artist (track 9)
Phalon "Jazze Pha" Alexander – featured artist (track 11)
Dennis "AK47" Round – featured artist (track 12)
Money Marv – featured artist (track 12)
Thomas "Low Key" McCollum – featured artist (track 14)
Brad "Scarface" Jordan – featured artist (track 14)
Sheldon "Slice T" Arrington – drum programming (track 11), producer (tracks: 7, 9, 10, 14), engineering, mixing
Stephen "Paragon" Carroll – co-producer (track 3)
Ferrell "Ensayne Wayne" Miles – co-producer (track 6)
Jeff Wilbanks – engineering
Micah Harrison – engineering
Chris Bellman – mastering
James "J Prince" Smith – executive producer
Roque Graphics – artwork, design
Mario Castellanos – photography
Anzel "Int'l Red" Jennings – A&R
Tony "Big Chief" Randle – production supervisor

Charts

References

External links

2000 albums
Tela (rapper) albums
Rap-A-Lot Records albums